Don Paolo Maria Giulio Camillo Emilio Adriano dei Principi Ruspoli (Montughi, Florence, 8 September 1899 – 1969) was an Italian and Spanish aristocrat, son of Camillo Ruspoli, 4th Marquis of Boadilla del Monte and his wife Emilia dei Conti Orlandini del Beccuto.

He was 5th Marqués de Boadilla del Monte with a Coat of Arms of Ruspoli, and Prince of the Holy Roman Empire.

He died unmarried and without issue and was succeeded in the title by his second cousin Camilo Ruspoli, 4th Duke of Alcudia and Sueca.

Sources 

 
 
 

1899 births
1969 deaths
Paolo
Marquesses of Boadilla del Monte